Hussein Ali Abdulle (died 9 May 2017 in Mogadishu, Somalia) was a Somali football coach and former player.

Representing the Ocean Stars in many international competitions and matches during the 1960s and 70s, Abdulle was seen as one of Somalia's most respected footballers of his time and went on to coach the national team.

He died on 9 May 2017 aged 71 after a long illness in his Mogadishu home and was interred afterwards.

FIFA President Gianni Infantino gave his commiserations in a letter to the Somali Football Federation two days after Abdulle's passing.

References

2017 deaths
Somalian footballers
Somalian football managers
Somalia international footballers
Year of birth missing
Sportspeople from Mogadishu
Association footballers not categorized by position
Somalia national football team managers